is a Japanese idol and a member of the girl group Momoiro Clover Z. She is the former leader of the group, before leadership was passed to Kanako Momota, and her signature color in the group is purple. 

Takagi was born in Kanagawa Prefecture. In April 2012, she became a DJ of her own radio show called Takagi Reni no King of Rock.

Appearances

  (film, 2015)

Solo Work

Songs
 (2011)
 (2012)
 (2016)
 (2017)
 (2017)
 (2017)
Tail wind (2018)
 (2019)
spart! (2019)
 (Nagano & Takagi) (2019)
 (2019)
 (2020)
SKY HIGH (2021)
Go! Go! Heaven (2021)
 (2022)
Love is Show (Masayuki Suzuki feat. Reni Takagi) (2022)
 (Reni Takagi with Cypress Ueno and Roberto Yoshino) (2023)

Studio albums
 (2021)

Video albums
 (2017)
 (2018)
 (2019)
 (2019)
 (2020)

References

External links 
 Reni Takagi's official Stardust profile
 Momoiro Clover Z profile
 Blogs
 Reni Takagi's official Ameblo blog (2011–present)
 Reni Takagi's official Gree blog (2010–2011)
 Reni Takagi's posts at the Momoiro Clover official blog (2009–2010)
 Reni Takagi's posts at the 3B School Girl blog (2008–2009)
 Reni Takagi at Imatsubu (2010)
 

Momoiro Clover Z members
1993 births
Living people
Japanese idols
Japanese women pop singers
21st-century Japanese actresses
Stardust Promotion artists
Musicians from Kanagawa Prefecture